Amerila nigrivenosa is a moth of the  subfamily Arctiinae. It was described by Karl Grünberg in 1910. It is found in the Democratic Republic of Congo, Rwanda and Uganda.

References

 , 1910I in:  (Ed.) Zoologische und anthropologische Ergebnisse einer Forschungsreise in Westlichen and Zentralen Süd-Afrika. Denkschriften der Medicinisch-Naturwissenschaftlichen Gesellschaft Jena 16 (Band 4): 91-146.
 , 1997: A revision of the Afrotropical taxa of the genus Amerila Walker (Lepidoptera, Arctiidae). Systematic Entomology 22 (1): 1-44.

Moths described in 1910
Amerilini
Insects of the Democratic Republic of the Congo
Insects of Uganda
Moths of Africa